This is an alphabetical list of Austrian composers.

The portraits at right are seven of the most-prominent Austrian composers, as agreed by three published reviews.

A – M

 Johann Georg Albrechtsberger (1736–1809) Classical-era composer of preludes, fugues and sonatas for the piano
 Elkan Bauer (1852–1942) 20th-century composer; wrote popular waltzes
 Alban Berg (1885–1935) 20th-century composer; member of the Second Viennese School
 Anton Bruckner (1824–1896) composer of nine large-scale symphonies, sacred works and organ works; church organist
 Antonio Casimir Cartellieri (1772–1807)
 Franz Clement (1780–1842), full name Franz Joseph Clement
 Carl Czerny (1791–1857) composer; student of Ludwig van Beethoven; known for his piano exercises and pedagogy
 Anton Diabelli (1781–1858), also Antonio
 Carl Ditters von Dittersdorf (1739–1799) Classical-era composer and violinist
 Nico Dostal (1895–1981) – composer, arranger, Kapellmeister
 Anton Eberl (1765–1807)
 Joseph Leopold Eybler (1765–1846)
 Robert Fuchs (1847–1927)
 Johann Fux (1660–1741) composer, influential theorist on Renaissance counterpoint
 Heinz Karl Gruber (born 1943) composer, bassist and singer
 Siegmund von Hausegger (1872–1948)
 Georg Friedrich Haas (born 1953)  composer of contemporary classical music
 Joseph Haydn (1732–1809) Classical-era composer; composed 104 symphonies, as well as numerous string quartets and other chamber music, operas and sacred works
 Michael Haydn (1737–1806) Classical-era composer; younger brother of Joseph Haydn
 Leopold Hoffman (1738–1793) Classical-era composer
 Johann Nepomuk Hummel (1778–1837)  composer and pianist; music bridged the Classical and Romantic periods
 Charles Kálmán (1929–2015); also Charles Kalman.
 Erich Kleiber (1890–1956)
 Fritz Kreisler (1875–1962) 20th-century violinist and composer
 Nikolaus von Krufft (1779–1818)Classical composer of piano music and lieder
 Josef Labor (1842–1924)
 August Lanner (1835–1855), born Augustin Lanner
 Joseph Franz Karl Lanner (1801–1843) early-Romantic-era dance-music composer; one-time colleague of Johann Strauss I
 Bruno Liberda (born 1953) composer; student of Roman Haubenstock-Ramati; contemporary classical music; first electronic music ever to be performed in the Vienna State Opera
 Franz Liszt (1811–1886) Hungarian composer, born in the Kingdom of Hungary, Austrian Empire
 Gustav Mahler (1860–1911) late-Romantic composer of large-scale and sometimes programmatic symphonies; born in Bohemia in a German-speaking community, a subject of the Habsburg Empire; music director in Vienna in the 1890s and 1900s
 Marianna Martines (1744–1812) – composer, singer and pianist
 Alois Melichar (1896–1976) – composer, arranger and conductor
 Jacques de Menasce (1905–1960) – became an American in 1941
 Franz Xaver Wolfgang Mozart (1791–1844) son of Wolfgang Amadeus Mozart
 Leopold Mozart (1719–1787) Classical-era composer, violinist, author of influential treatise on playing the violin
 Wolfgang Amadeus Mozart (1756–1791) Classical-era composer of operas, piano concertos, chamber music, symphonies and sacred works; son of Leopold Mozart

N – Z

 Sigismund von Neukomm (1778–1858) born Sigismond Neukomm, after ennoblement as a knight Sigismund Ritter von Neukomm
 Karl von Ordóñez (1734–1786) also Carlo or Carl d'Ordonetz, Ordonnetz, d'Ordóñez, d'Ordonez, Ordoniz
 Kurt Overhoff (1902–1986) composer and conductor
 Leonhard Päminger (1495–1567) also Paminger and Panninger
 Maria Theresa von Paradis (1759–1824) Classical-era composer; inspiration for the Piano Concerto No. 18 in B-flat major by Wolfgang Amadeus Mozart
 Johann Baptist Peyer (c.1678–1733) organist and composer
 Walter Rabl (1873–1940) Viennese composer, conductor and teacher of vocal music
 Carl Georg Reutter (1708–1772) Baroque-era court composer
 Emil von Reznicek (1860–1945) born Emil Nikolaus Joseph, Freiherr von Reznicek
 Franz Xaver Richter (1709–1789) Czech František, French François Xavier
 Johann Heinrich Schmelzer (1623–1680) composer and violinist; first German-speaking composer to publish solo violin and b.c. sonatas in the Italian style (Sonatae unarum fidium seu a violino solo, 1664)
 Franz Schmidt (1874–1939) 20th-century composer of symphonies and operas, cellist and pianist
 Arnold Schoenberg (1874–1951) 20th-century modernist composer; founder of the Second Viennese School; developer of the twelve-tone technique
 Franz Schubert (1797–1828) Classical-/Romantic-era composer; regarded as the first significant lieder writer; composer of many instrumental works as well
 Robert Stolz (1880–1975) conductor and composer of operettas, film music and songs
 Eduard Strauss (1835–1916) dance-music composer; brother of Johann Strauss II
 Johann Strauss I (1804–1849) early-Romantic-era dance-music composer
 Johann Strauss II (1825–1899) Romantic-era composer of waltzes and polkas, wrote The Blue Danube waltz
 Josef Strauss (1827–1870) dance-music composer; brother of Johann Strauss II
 Franz von Suppé (1819–1895) composer of light opera
 Franz Xaver Süssmayr (1766–1803) Classical-era composer; student of Wolfgang Amadeus Mozart
 Sigismond Thalberg (1812–1871)
 Joseph Umstatt (1711–1762)
 Johann Joseph Vilsmayr (1663–1722)
 Georg Christoph Wagenseil (1715–1777) Classical-era composer, harpsichordist, and organist
 Anton Webern (1883–1945) 20th-century composer, member of the Second Viennese School; used the twelve-tone technique in addition to the style known as serialism
 Egon Joseph Wellesz (1885–1974) 20th-century composer, teacher, musicologist; pupil of Arnold Schoenberg and student of Byzantine music
 Erich Zeisl (1905–1959) Modernist Jewish Viennese composer of symphonies, ballets, choral music, operas, and film scores; fled Nazis for America in 1938
 Karl Michael Ziehrer (1843–1922), also spelled as Carl

References

See also

 Chronological list of Austrian classical composers
 List of Austrians in music
 List of German composers

Austria
Composers
Composers